Montefollonico is a village in Tuscany, central Italy, administratively a frazione of the comune of Torrita di Siena, province of Siena. At the time of the 2001 census its population was 149.

Montefollonico is about 60 km from Siena and 8 km from Torrita di Siena.

References 

Frazioni of the Province of Siena